The discography of the English rock band Elbow consists of nine studio albums and numerous EPs and singles. The band was first formed in while its members were secondary school and opted for the name Elbow in 1997. The band recorded a 5-track demo EP titled Noisebox, named after the studio where it was recorded. Four songs were later re-recorded for the deluxe edition of the debut album while a live-version was chosen for  the fifth. The band were signed to Island Records and recorded an album with Steve Osborne that was shelved after the Universal take-over. Released from their contract, the band released the Newborn and Any Day Now EPs through Ugly Man Records that featured some of the material recorded with Osborne. In early 2001 Elbow signed with V2 Records.

Albums

Studio albums

Compilation albums

Live albums

Extended plays

Singles

Notes

References

Elbow